This is a list of the winners of the  Melbourne Cup. The Melbourne Cup is Australia's major thoroughbred horse race. It is run at Flemington Racecourse in Melbourne.  Each year, internationally bred or owned horses compete in the race. Since 1882, New Zealand–bred horses have won 40 Melbourne Cups, British-bred horses five, American-bred horses four, Irish-bred horses four, German and French-bred horses two each, and Japanese-bred horses one.

Winners

 The shortest-priced favourite in Cup history was Phar Lap when he won in 1930 at 8-11 ($1.72).
 Metrication – The race was originally held over two miles (about 3,218 metres), but following Australia's adoption of the Metric system in the 1970s the current distance of 3,200 metres was adopted in 1972. The present record holder is the 1990 winner Kingston Rule with a time of 3min 16.3sec.

Winners gallery

1934 racebook

See also

 Victoria Racing Club
 Australian horse-racing
 Melbourne Spring Racing Carnival
 List of Melbourne Cup placings

Notes

Further reading

External links
Official website

Australian horse racing lists
Flemington Racecourse
Melbourne sport-related lists
Winners
 
History of Melbourne
1861 establishments in Australia